The surname Sartorius may refer to:

 Émile Sartorius, French footballer
 Euston Henry Sartorius, British Major General and brother of Reginald
 Georg Friedrich Sartorius, German historian
 George Rose Sartorius, British Admiral
 George William Sartorius, British painter
 Jacob Sartorius, American Internet personality and singer
 Luis José Sartorius, Spanish Prime Minister, 1853–54
 Norm Sartorius, American woodworker and artist
 Norman Sartorius, Croatian psychiatrist
 Paul Sartorius, French hockey player
 Paul Sartorius (composer), German composer and organist
 Reginald William Sartorius, British Major General and brother of Euston
 Vicente Sartorius, Spanish nobleman and Olympic bobsledder
 Wolfgang Sartorius von Waltershausen, German geologist

See also 

 Sartorius family, English painters

Occupational surnames
Latin-language surnames